Fat camp may refer to:
Weight loss camp, a type of residential retreat where overweight or obese people go to lose weight with exercise and lifestyle changes.
Fat Camp (South Park)
Fat Camp: An MTV Docs Movie Presentation
Fat Camp, the original name of Gigantic (musical)